Meziadin Junction is a work camp in northwest British Columbia, Canada, near the border with Alaska, United States. The highway splits in its journey north from Terrace to Dease Lake, with one branch (Highway 37A) heading west over Bear Pass to Stewart and terminating at Hyder, Alaska.

References

Unincorporated settlements in British Columbia
Nass Country
Populated places in the Regional District of Kitimat–Stikine